Basilica di San Marco may refer to:

 Basilica di San Marco (Florence)
 Basilica di San Marco (Rome)
 Basilica di San Marco (Venice)